Jean Soldini (born 13 March 1956 in Lugano) is a Swiss and French philosopher, art historian and poet.

Biography

He studied in Paris, where he earned the Habilitation à diriger des recherches (1995), after he graduated with a Ph.D. in philosophy and with a preceding Ph.D. in history of architecture.

Knowledge and hospitality

His studies are aimed to build a non-authoritarian metaphysics where aesthetics of hospitality plays a primary role within knowledge, looking for the possibility of a resistance against the annihilation of the Other. A resistance against the arrogance of any kind of authoritarian thinking with its multiform camouflages, with its never-ending threat against what is existing-with-other. The aesthetics of hospitality does not be confused with an aestheticization of hospitality. It is a philosophy involved to reflect on sensation through what has its focus on the senses: to donate and receive food, water, a roof for sleeping.
Soldini is also author of essays on Alberto Giacometti, on the philosophical margins of a creative work that put into effect the vital desire to know radically.

Bibliography

Monico. L'opera incisa, preface by Vittorio Fagone, Bellinzona, Casagrande,1987.
La Pinacoteca Züst, Bellinzona, Casagrande, 1988.
Affreschi tardoromanici nel Battistero di Riva San Vitale, Bellinzona, Casagrande, 1990.
Alberto Giacometti. Le colossal, la mère, le “sacré”, Lausanne, L’Age d'Homme, 1993.
Saggio sulla discesa della bellezza. Linee per un'estetica, Milan, Jaca Book, 1995.
Alberto Giacometti. La somiglianza introvabile, preface by René Schérer, Milan, Jaca Book, 1998.
Cose che sporgono, “alla chiara fonte”, Lugano, 2004 (Book of the year 2005 of Swiss Schiller Foundation).
Il riposo dell'amato. Una metafisica per l'uomo nell'epoca del mercato come fine unico, Milan, Jaca Book, 2005.
"Storia, memoria, arte sacra tra passato e futuro", Sacre Arti, edited by F. Gualdoni, texts by T. Tzara, S. Yanagi, T. Burckhardt,  2008.
“Resistance and Beauty of the Other”, FMR White Edition, Milan, 2008, n.4, pp. 96–109.
Bivacchi, Ulivo, Balerna 2009.
Resistenza e ospitalità, Milan, Jaca Book, 2010. 
A testa in giù. Per un'ontologia della vita in comune, preface by René Schérer, Milan, Mimesis, 2012.
Tenere il passo, preface by Jean-Charles Vegliante, Edizioni Lietocolle, Faloppio (Como) 2014.
Alberto Giacometti. L'espace et la force, Éditions Kimé, Paris, 2016.
Graphics on the Border between Art and Thought / Alberto Giacometti. Grafica al confine fra arte e pensiero, edited by Jean Soldini and Nicoletta Ossanna Cavadini, Skira, Milan 2020.  
Schiave e minatori. Versi per una scena, Museo Vela, Ligornetto 2021.  
Il cuore dell'essere,la grazia delle attrazioni. Tentativi di postantropocentrismo,preface by Roberto Diodato, Milan, Mimesis, 2022.

References

Sylvain Latendresse, “Giacometti: à l’ombre du marcheur”, Espace Sculpture, Montréal, n° 46, 1998.
Terry Kirk, The Architecture of Modern Italy. The Challenge of Tradition 1750-1900, Princeton Architectural Press, New York 2005.
Giovanni Trabucco, “Arte e Teologia”, Orientamenti bibliografici, edited by the Facoltà Teologica dell'Italia settentrionale, Milano 2006, 28.
Maria Dolores Pesce, “Della trascendenza orizzontale”, dramma.it, 2006.
Isabelle Roche, “La Revue Blanche FMR numéro 4”, Le Litteraire.com, 3 dicembre 2008.
Christine Bouche, Alberto Giacometti. La femme, le sphinx et l'effroi, Paris, L'Harmattan, 2004.
James Madge and Andrew Peckham, Narrating Architecture. A Retrospective Anthology, London, Routledge, 2006, p. 35.
Julie F. Codell, The Political Economy of Art. Making the Nation of Culture, Fairleigh Dickinson University Press, Madison, New Jersey 2008.
Pascal Gabellone, La blessure du réel. La poésie et l'art à l'épreuve du monde, Parigi, L'Harmattan, 2011.
Marco Martinelli, interview by, “«Ma noi siamo stranieri». Un incontro a Lido Adriano su ospitalità e libertà”, Cenobio, 2012, 1.
Modesta di Paola, Ética de la hospitalidad lingüística, in "Interartive", 47, December 2012 http://interartive.org/2012/12/etica-hospitalidad-linguistica/
Renato Miracco, “Alberto Giacometti: The Core of Life”, i-Italy, The multimedia network for all things Italian in America, June 28,2018.
Modesta di Paola,Cosmopolitics and Biopolitics. Ethics and Aesthetics in Contemporary Art,Edicions de la Universitat de Barcelona, Barcelona 2018.

External links
http://www.viceversalitterature.ch/author/6044
http://www.culturactif.ch/ecrivains/soldini_jean.htm
http://www.swissinfo.ch/eng/archive/Alberto_Giacometti:_a_single-minded_passion.html?cid=2300986
http://www.swissinfo.ch/ita/index.html?cid=2288334
https://web.archive.org/web/20070627052554/http://www.rtsi.ch/trasm/fiumi/welcome.cfm?idg=0
http://nuovaprovincia.blogspot.com/2012/02/jean-soldini-frontiera-e-vita-in-comune.html
http://www.teatrodellealbe.com/public/stagioni_pieghevoliecataloghi/Catalogo19.pdf

Swiss art historians
Swiss male poets
Philosophers of art
20th-century Swiss philosophers
21st-century Swiss philosophers
Metaphysicians
Postmodernists
1956 births
Living people